Events in the year 1964 in Portugal.

Incumbents
President: Américo Tomás
Prime Minister: António de Oliveira Salazar

Events
18 July – Madeira Airport opened

Arts and entertainment

Sports
UD Nordeste founded

Births

10 February – José Garcia, canoer.
24 July – Pedro Passos Coelho, prime minister

Deaths
2 September – Francisco Craveiro Lopes, president (born 1894)

References

 
1960s in Portugal
Portugal
Years of the 20th century in Portugal
Portugal